The Castrovirreyna Province is one of seven provinces located in the Huancavelica Region of Peru. The capital of this province is the city of Castrovirreyna.

Geography 
The Chunta mountain range traverses the province. Some of the highest peaks of the province are listed below:

Political division
The province is divided into thirteen districts, which are:

 Arma (Arma)
 Aurahua (Aurahua)
 Capillas (Capillas)
 Castrovirreyna (Castrovirreyna)
 Chupamarca (Chupamarca)
 Cocas (Cocas)
 Huachos (Huachos)
 Huamatambo (Huamatambo)
 Mollepampa (Mollepampa)
 San Juan (San Juan)
 Santa Ana (Santa Ana)
 Tantara (Tantara)
 Ticrapo (Ticrapo)

Ethnic groups 
The province is inhabited by Indigenous citizens of Quechua descent. Spanish is the language which the majority of the population (77.20%) learnt to speak in childhood, 22.30% of the residents started speaking using the Quechua language (2007 Peru Census).

See also 
 Aknuqucha
 Chuqlluqucha
 Urququcha

References 

Provinces of the Huancavelica Region